This is a list of notable people associated with the University of North Dakota in Grand Forks, North Dakota. This list includes both alumni and faculty members.

Alumni

National and international award winners

Pulitzer Prize winners
Maxwell Anderson – Pulitzer Prize-winning playwright, author, poet, reporter, and lyricist
Mel Ruder – editor of the Hungry Horse News in Columbia Falls, Montana; 1965 Pulitzer Prize winner in Journalism for spot news covering a 1964 flood in Montana

Rhodes scholars
Thomas McGrath – distinguished poet and Rhodes scholar

Arts and entertainment
Sam Anderson – actor
Srinivas Avasarala – film director and actor
Michael Halstenson – musician and composer
Nicole Linkletter – winner of reality show America's Next Top Model fifth season
Shadoe Stevens – announcer on Hollywood Squares

Athletics

Business

Law, politics, and government

Literature and journalism

Military
Harvey M. Haakenson – former brigadier general in the National Guard of the United States
David Charles Jones – former Chairman of the Joint Chiefs of Staff and former general in the United States Air Force
Kevin B. Kuklok – former major general in the United States Marine Corps
Joane Mathews – brigadier general in the National Guard of the United States
Homer N. Wallin – former vice admiral in the United States Navy

Science
Cora Smith Eaton – physician, suffragist and mountaineer
Carl Eielson – pioneer aviator
Judith Kaur, physician and advocate for Native American health equity
Karen L. Nyberg – NASA astronaut
Harry Nyquist – important contributor to information theory; recipient of the IEEE Medal of Honor (1960)
Vilhjalmur Stefansson – Arctic explorer

Faculty

See also
List of presidents of the University of North Dakota

References 

 

North Dakota
University